SkySniper is an air-to-surface missile developed by Israel Aerospace Industries IAI. The SkySniper uses GPS/INS guidance for targeting under all weather conditions. IAI designed the SkySniper for a maximum loadout of four missiles on contemporary combat aircraft such as the F-15, F/A-18, F-16, MiG-29, and Kfir.

See also 

MARS (missile)

References

Rocket weapons
Air-to-surface missiles
Guided missiles of Israel
MLM products